Casticus was a nobleman of the Sequani of eastern Gaul. His father, Catamantaloedes, had previously been the ruler of the tribe and had been recognized as a "friend" by the Roman Senate.

Social position 
According to Julius Caesar, Casticus was a Sequanian whose father Catamantaloedes had been king for many years.  It is believed that he was chosen by Orgetorix to join his conspiracy because he was one of the "two most prominent chieftains within his reach."

Conspiracy 
In 60 B.C. he entered into a conspiracy with Orgetorix of the Helvetii and Dumnorix of the Aedui. Each individual gave a pledge and swore an oath to one another in the hope that when they seized the sovereignty that they would be the three most powerful and valiant nations. This plan however fell apart when the conspiracy was made known to the Helvetii by an informer.
Some historians have found links between the Conspiracy of Orgetorix the Helvetian, Dumnorix the Aeduan, and Casticus as an allusion to the First Triumvirate.  William Henry Altman expands on Yves Gerhard's views of this by presenting six parallels between what he calls "The Gallic Triumvirate" and the First Triumvirate.

Parallels between "The Gallic Triumvirate" and the First Triumvirate 
 Secret character of alliance
 Chronological simultaneity of two triads
 Common goal of two conspiracies
 Use of marriage for political goal
 Common appeal to people against aristocracy
 Eventual defeat of coalitions

Death 
The cause of Casticus’ death is not detailed in the accounts given by Caesar. However, according to Rene Van Royen, it can be inferred that Casticus was either put to death swiftly upon the discovery of the conspiracy by the Helvetii or that he faced a fate similar to the one that Orgetorix faced (burning) when he was brought forward for trial by the Helvetii.  
Since the account of his death is missing, it is not known exactly what fate awaited Casticus. All that is known thus far is inferred from what is known of the people and the times.

Literature and drama 
Despite not much being known about the Conspiracy of Orgetorix, there have been two dramas written that detail the account of what is believed to have happened. In each of these accounts Casticus makes an appearance and plays a very brief part in the drama.

The Conspiracy of Orgetorix, A Dramatization 
This play details Orgetorix as he begins planning and persuading others to join in his conspiracy. The drama was designed for there to not be any costumes worn except for swords, shields, and spears for the soldiers. This is largely due to the fact that this play was written in as a project for the author's Latin class to perform. Casticus does not appear until Act III of the play. In this act Orgetorix persuades Dumnorix and Casticus to join the conspiracy in the hopes of gaining control of Gaul. The final act of the play is the trial of Orgetorix after the conspiracy has been revealed.

Dumnorix, A Play Fabula Braccata 
This play also details the accounts of what takes place during the formation of the conspiracy. Similar to The Conspiracy of Orgetorix, A Dramatization, it is also written in Latin.

References

Celtic warriors
Gaulish rulers
Celts
1st-century BC rulers in Europe
Sequani